Sarah Gordon (24 October 1963 – 29 April 2016) was an Irish equestrian. She competed in two events at the 1984 Summer Olympics.

References

External links
 

1963 births
2016 deaths
Irish female equestrians
Olympic equestrians of Ireland
Equestrians at the 1984 Summer Olympics
Place of birth missing